The following lists events that happened during 2014 in the Republic of Bulgaria.

Incumbents 
 President: Rosen Plevneliev
 Prime Minister: 
 until 6 August: Plamen Oresharski 
 6 August-7 November: Georgi Bliznashki
 starting 7 November: Boyko Borisov

Events

April
 April 11 - Secretary General of NATO Anders Fogh Rasmussen visits Bulgaria and meets with President Rosen Plevneliev, during his visit he calls on Russia to withdraw their troops from the Ukrainian border.

References

 
2010s in Bulgaria
Bulgaria
Years of the 21st century in Bulgaria
Bulgaria